Richard Keshen (born: 1946) is a Canadian university professor of humanities.

Biography 

He was born in 1946 in Canada.

He got married to Mary Robertson in 1969.

He has two children: Aaron and Colin.

Education 

He completed his undergraduate degree at Glendon College, York University.

He completed his post-graduation at Balliol College, Oxford University.

In 1998, he became a visiting scholar at Wolfson College, Oxford University.

Career 

He is currently a Professor Emeritus of Humanities at Cape Breton University.

References

External links 
 Official Website
 Biography
 Publications

Canadian academics
1946 births
Living people
Academic staff of Cape Breton University